Jung-dong Station is a station on Seoul Subway Line 1 and the Gyeongin Line.

Vicinity

Exit 1 : Bucheon High & Girls' Middle Schools
Exit 2 : Jungdong APT, Bucheon Middle & Girls' High Schools

References

Seoul Metropolitan Subway stations
Metro stations in Bucheon
Railway stations opened in 1987